"Party at Ground Zero" is a song by the ska punk band Fishbone. A demo version titled "Pink Vapor Stew" can be found on the Fishbone 101 compilation. Fishbone performed the song in the movie The Tripper and was featured in the 1994 movie Camp Nowhere.

Music video
The music video for "Party at Ground Zero" was directed by Henry Selick, future director of The Nightmare Before Christmas. The video is a homage to The Masque of the Red Death, with Death bringing about a nuclear explosion when he removes his mask.

Still frames from the video are featured on the cover of the song's 12-inch single.

Track listing
A Side	 	
 "Party At Ground Zero (Vapor Mix)" - 7:02
 "Party At Ground Zero (Visual Mix)" - 4:50
B Side
 "Skankin' To The Beat" - 3:11

Accolades

References

Fishbone songs
1985 singles
1985 songs
Songs written by Angelo Moore
Song recordings produced by David Kahne
Columbia Records singles
Songs about nuclear war and weapons